Bhooi  is a village in Kapurthala district of Punjab State, India. The village is administrated by a Sarpanch, who is an elected representative.

Demography 
According to the report published by Census India in 2011, Bhooi has a total number of 242 houses and population of 1,178 of which include 613 males and 565 females. Literacy rate of Bhooi is  77.98%, higher than state average of 75.84%.  The population of children under the age of 6 years is 138 which is  11.71% of total population of Bhooi, and child sex ratio is approximately  1190, higher than state average of 846.

Population data

Air travel connectivity 
The closest airport to the village is Sri Guru Ram Dass Jee International Airport.

Villages in Kapurthala

External links
  Villages in Kapurthala
 Kapurthala Villages List

References

Villages in Kapurthala district